Thomas Joseph Reid (15 August 1905 – 1972) was a Scottish footballer.

Born in Motherwell, Lanarkshire, he began his career with Blantyre Victoria and moved to Clydebank for a season before moving to England in 1926 to play for Liverpool, with the Reds paying a fee of £1,000 to sign him.

After almost three years with Liverpool, during which time he scored 30 goals in 55 Football League and FA Cup appearances, Reid transferred to Manchester United in January 1929. He played for the Red Devils for four years, leaving midway through the 1932–33 season, after scoring 67 goals in 101 league and FA Cup appearances.

He joined Oldham Athletic and played for them for two years before joining Barrow. He also played for Prescot Cables before ending his career with Rhyl Athletic.

References

1905 births
1972 deaths
Scottish footballers
Association football forwards
Liverpool F.C. players
Oldham Athletic A.F.C. players
Manchester United F.C. players
Footballers from Motherwell
Prescot Cables F.C. players
Clydebank F.C. (1914) players
Barrow A.F.C. players
Rhyl F.C. players
Blantyre Victoria F.C. players
English Football League players
Scottish Football League players
Scottish Junior Football Association players